Syrus Marcus Ware is a Canadian artist, activist and scholar.  He lives and works in Toronto, Ontario, Canada and is an Assistant Professor in the School of the Arts at McMaster University. He has worked since 2014 as faculty and as a designer for The Banff Centre. Ware is the inaugural artist-in-residence for Daniels Spectrum, a cultural centre in Toronto, and a founding member of Black Lives Matter Toronto. For 13 years, he was the coordinator of the Art Gallery of Ontario's youth program. During that time Ware oversaw the creation of the Free After Three program and the expansion of the youth program into a multi pronged offering.

He has published four books and in 2020 co-edited (with Rodney Diverlus and Sandy Hudson) Until We Are Free: Reflections on Black Lives Matter in Canada, a bestselling collection of reflections on the Black Lives Matter movement in Canada.

Early life and education
Syrus Marcus Ware was born in Montreal, Quebec and is the twin brother of entomologist Dr. Jessica Ware. He attended Etobicoke School of the Arts for high school before transferring to Forrest Hill Collegiate Institute. Ware studied art history and visual studies at University of Toronto and University of British Columbia, earning his Honours Bachelors in 2002. He studied with Joanne Tod and the late David Buller. During his studies he was the coordinator for the Centre for Women and Trans People at the University of Toronto.

Ware began his Masters of Arts in Sociology and Equity Studies in Education at the Ontario Institute for Studies in Education in 2006, graduating in 2010. Ware began his PhD in the Faculty of Environmental Studies at York University in 2014 and successfully defended this doctoral thesis in 2021. He is a Sylff Fellow and a Vanier Canada Graduate Scholarships scholar.

Career 
Ware's work explores social justice frameworks and Black activist culture through performance, large scale drawing, installations, paintings and dance. He specifically focuses on issues surrounding gender, sexuality and race. Ware's art centres around his beliefs in social justice and activism.

Ware was selected to be part of the Toronto Biennial inaugural 2019 and 2022 exhibitions. At the 2019 Biennial he created Antarctica, a performance and interactive installation about white supremacy and climate change and Ancestors, Do You Read Us: Dispatches From The Future, an 8 channel video work created with Mishann Lau and set in 2072 in a world where Black and Indigenous people have survived climate change and race wars. His work has been shown at locations and events that include the Sydney Festival, the Art Gallery of Burlington, the Art Gallery of Ontario, The Art Gallery of Windsor, The University of Lethbridge Art Gallery, The Gladstone Hotel, and the Art Gallery of York University.

In 2021, Ware was commissioned to write a new play, Emmett, for Obsidian Theatre and CBC Gem. The play is set in a near future in a decidedly different landscape and follows Medgar (a reimagined, future living Medgar Evers) on the day that everything changes. The performance was filmed in Toronto in 2021 and features actor Prince Amponsah. Directed by Tanisha Taitt, the production began broadcasting on CBC Gem on February 12, 2021.

Community radio 
For 17 years, Ware was the host of Resistance on the Sound dial, a community radio show on 89.5 CIUT FM. In the show he combined activist music with political interviews and conversations with activists and artists, such as Octavia E. Butler, New Zealand transgender MP Georgina Beyer, Ursula Rucker, Tumi & the Volume and Bob Moses from SNCC. He also participated in other shows on the station including Wench Radio, Radio OPIRG and By All Means.

Activism 
Ware is a long time abolitionist - he has been an activist for 25 years. He was a core team member with Black Lives Matter - Toronto. He is a co-founder of Black Lives Matter - Canada and Wildseed Centre for Art and Activism. Ware has collaborated with Blackness Yes! over the last 18 years in order to create events like the trans and black stage at Pride called Blockorama. Ware is also one of the founding members of both the Toronto based Prison Justice Action Committee and the Gay Bi Queer Trans Mens HIV Prevention Working Group, which created "Primed: the Back Pocket Guide for Trans Guys and the Guys who Dig em" - the first sexual health resource for trans men who have sex with men in the world. He also helped to create TransFathers 2B, the first parenting course for trans men considering parenting in North America, based in The 519 Community Centre.

Ware has stated that his intent is to dismantle white supremacy within the arts and diversify the museum field.

Awards and honors 
Now Magazine awarded Ware with the "Best Queer Activist" award in 2005. He received the TD Diversity Award in 2017.  He was awarded the 
Min Sook Lee Labour Arts Award, Mayworks Festival of Working People in the Arts in 2017. Ware is a Vanier Scholar and a Sylff Fellow.

In 2012, he received the Steinert & Ferreiro Award for LGBTQ activism, the largest award of its kind in Canada.

Bibliography

As editor 

 Queering Urban Justice: Queer of Colour Formations in Toronto (2018, University of Toronto Press, with Jin Haritaworn, Ghaida Moussa, and Río Rodríguez)
 Marvellous Grounds: Queer of Colour Histories of Toronto (2018, Between the Lines, with Jin Haritaworn and Ghaida Moussa)
 Until We Are Free: Reflections on Black Lives Matter in Canada (2020, University of Regina Press, with Rodney Diverlus and Sandy Hudson)

As artist 
Love is in the Hair (2015, Flamingo Rampant Press, also author)

Bridge of Flowers (2018, Flamingo Rampant Press, with Leah Lakshmi Piepzna-Samarasinha - author)

I Promise (2019, Arsenal Pulp Press, with Catherine Hernandez - author)

Antarctica (2019, Toronto Biennial of Art)

This mixed media installation piece incorporates the themes: race, Anthropocene, politics and activism, and post-apocalyptic imaginary. The mediums include furniture, sheets, paint cans and various living space setting-like props. The piece was commissioned by the Toronto Biennial of Art with the RBC Emerging Canadian Artists Program providing support. The videographer and Editorial support was from Mishann Lau, as well as textile support provided by Merlin Hargreaves. The piece is connected with Ancestors, Can You Read Us? (Dispatches from the Future) 2019 at the Ryerson Image Centre.

Further reading

References

External links 

 

1977 births
Living people
Activists from Montreal
Artists from Montreal
Black Lives Matter people
University of Toronto alumni
York University alumni
Writers from Montreal
Canadian LGBT artists
Black Canadian LGBT people
Black Canadian artists
Transgender academics
Black Canadian activists
Canadian transgender writers
Transgender artists
Transgender men
Canadian LGBT academics